Spitz is a type of domestic dog.

Spitz may also refer to:

Places 
 Spitz, Austria, a market town
 Spitz (Liechtenstein), a mountain
 Spitz Ridge, Marie Byrd Land, Antarctica

Arts and entertainment
 Spitz (band), a Japanese rock band
 Spitz (album), 1991
 The Spitz, a former music venue in London, England
 Spitz Prize, a award for books on liberal and/or democratic theory
 Spitz, a character in the video game series Wario

Other uses 
 Spitz (surname), including a list of people with the name
 Spitz (protein), a protein in fruit flies
 SL-C3000 (Spitz), a model of the Sharp Zaurus personal digital assistant
 Spitz Stadium, Alberta, Canada, used primarily for baseball
 Vancil Spitz S1, an American homebuilt aircraft

See also

 Spitz nevus, a skin lesion
 Spitzer (bullet)